{{DISPLAYTITLE:C19H21NO3}}
The molecular formula C19H21NO3 (molar mass: 311.37 g/mol, exact mass: 311.1521 u) may refer to:

 Nalorphine, also known as N-allylnormorphine
 2-OH-NPA
 Thebaine, also known as paramorphine